The Lower East Side Tenement Museum, located at 97 and 103 Orchard Street in the Lower East Side neighborhood of Manhattan, New York City, is a National Historic Site. The museum's two historical tenement buildings were home to an estimated 15,000 people, from over 20 nations, between 1863 and 2011. The museum, which includes a visitors' center, promotes tolerance and historical perspective on the immigrant experience.

History 
The building at 97 Orchard Street was contracted by Prussian-born immigrant Lukas Glockner in 1863 and was modified several times to conform with the city's developing housing laws. When first constructed, it contained 22 apartments and a basement level saloon. Over time, four stoop-level and two basement apartments were converted into commercial retail space, leaving 16 apartments in the building. Modifications over the years included the installation of indoor plumbing (cold running water, two toilets per floor), an air shaft, and gas followed by electricity. In 1935, rather than continuing to modify the building, the landlord evicted the residents, boarded the upper windows, and sealed the upper floors, leaving only the stoop-level and basement storefronts open for business. No further changes were made until the Lower East Side Tenement Museum became involved with the building in 1988. As such, the building stands as a kind of time capsule, reflecting 19th and early 20th century living conditions and the changing notions of what constitutes acceptable housing. In spite of the restoration, some parts of the upper floors are unstable and remain closed.

The Tenement Museum was founded in 1988 by Ruth J. Abram and Anita Jacobson. The museum's first key property, the tenement at 97 Orchard Street, was designated a National Historic Landmark on April 19, 1994. The National Historic Site was authorized on November 12, 1998. It is an affiliated area of the National Park Service but is owned and administered by the Lower East Side Tenement Museum. The site received a Save America's Treasures matching grant for $250,000 in 2000 for preservation work. In 2001 the museum was awarded the Rudy Bruner Award for Urban Excellence silver medal. In 2005, the museum was among 406 New York City arts and social service institutions to receive part of a $20 million grant from the Carnegie Corporation, which was made possible through a donation by New York City mayor Michael Bloomberg. The National Defense Authorization Act for the 2015 fiscal year expanded the National Historic Site designation to also include the tenement at 103 Orchard Street.

The Tenement Museum attracted some negative press in 2007 related to its employees seeking union membership as well as for its planned acquisition of the building at 99 Orchard Street through eminent domain in 2002.

The current president of the museum is Dr. Annie Polland, who took over the role from Dr. Morris Vogel in 2021.

Exhibits, collections, and programs
The museum's exhibits and programs include restored period room apartments and shops open daily for public tours, depicting the lives of immigrants who lived at 97 Orchard Street between 1869 and 1935 and 103 Orchard Street from the 1950s to the 1980s. The museum also provides a documentary film and offers tours with costumed interpreters for portraying the building's former residents, tastings of their communities' typical foods, and neighborhood walks. The museum's tours place the immigrants' lives in the broader context of American history. The museum also has an extensive collection of historical archives and provides a variety of educational programs.

An exhibition titled "Under One Roof" opened in December 2017. Located at 103 Orchard Street, above the Visitor's Center, the exhibition explores the lives of a Holocaust refugee family, a Puerto Rican migrant family, and a Chinese immigrant family.

In the spring of 2021, the Tenement Museum added “Reclaiming Black Spaces” to their list of available walking and virtual tours, educating visitors on Black experiences in the Lower East Side. This was inspired by a discovery in the museum's collection regarding two men named Joseph Moore. These men were both residents of NYC, were about the same age, and worked in the same profession. Their biggest difference was one was a white Irishman and lived in the museum's location at 97 Orchard Street, and the other was a Black man who lived in a nearby tenement house. The museum has recreated the kitchen of the Irish Joseph Moore, and they plan to open an apartment recreating the home of Joseph Moore and his family in 2022. This will be the first permanent apartment exhibit by the museum representing the Black experience.

The Tenement House Act 
There were many Tenement House Acts during the 1800s and 1900s. However, there were three particular Acts that changed the living conditions in housing today. Those three Tenement House Acts were: The Tenement House Act of 1867, The Tenement House Act of 1879, and The Tenement House Act of 1901 which is part of the New York State Tenement House Act.

The first tenement house act was called The Tenement House Act of 1867, also known as "the Old Law".  It was the country's first comprehensive housing reform law. The law required buildings to have fire escapes and at least one toilet for every 20 tenants and to be connected to the city sewers if possible. However, many people (tenement owners) did not follow the law, so it had little effect. Then came the second Tenement House Act which was called The Tenement House Act of 1879, also known as "the Old Law" and was followed by the 1867 law. Many buildings were outlawing the construction of buildings like 97 Orchard Street that had interior rooms without windows. The 1879 law required all rooms to be open onto the street, the rear yard, or an air shaft, for the tenant to escape the building in an emergency. This led owners to the development of the "dumbbell" tenement plan. Then came the third Tenement House Act which was called The Tenement House Act of 1901, also known as "The New Law." The government noticed that many of the tenement buildings were extremely dangerous and unlivable. The 1901 law required buildings to include running water, gas, light, and ventilation. The Dumb-bell tenement plan was outlawed. Since the previous Tenement House Act had not helped change the housing conditions, the law allowed the Tenement House Department to inspect these buildings and enforce the new regulations.

In popular culture 
Lower East Side Tenement Museum has been featured as a landmark in several films, including Crossing Delancey (1988)  and The Definition of Insanity (film) (2004), where the museum was used as setting for the interior hospital sequences. It also made a brief appearance in the Netflix original series “Dash & Lilly” (2020), where it is the exterior backdrop while Lily skips down the street at the beginning of Episode 2, Season 1.

See also
 List of museums and cultural institutions in New York City
 Jane Ziegelman, the museum's culinary director and author of 97 Orchard
 Bialystoker Synagogue
 A Stoop on Orchard Street, a musical inspired by a visit to the museum
 Tenement House (Glasgow), a similar museum in Scotland

References
Notes

Bibliography

External links

 Lower East Side Tenement Museum
 National Park Service: Lower East Side Tenement Museum National Historic Site
 Tenement Building at 97 Orchard Street, National Historic Landmark summary
   and  
 Public Law No: 105-378
 Biography of a Tenement House in New York City: An Architectural History of 97 Orchard Street, 

Lower East Side
History of immigration to the United States
National Historic Landmarks in Manhattan
Residential buildings on the National Register of Historic Places in Manhattan
National Historic Sites in New York (state)
Museums in Manhattan
Museums of human migration
Ethnic museums in New York City
Historic house museums in New York City
Progressive Era in the United States
1988 establishments in New York City
Museums established in 1988
Residential buildings completed in 1863